Annibale Bizzelli (23 April 1900, in Arezzo – 12 July 1967, in Rome) was an Italian composer.

Selected filmography
 Men of the Mountain (1943)
 The Lovers of Ravello (1951)

External links
https://www.discogs.com/artist/1786587-Annibale-Bizzelli
http://www.imdb.com/name/nm0084717/

Italian film score composers
Italian male film score composers
20th-century Italian composers
1900 births
1967 deaths
People from Arezzo
20th-century Italian male musicians